Dag Alexander Olsen (born 9 September 1989) is a Norwegian professional footballer who plays as a forward or winger.

Club career
After finishing his graduation in Tottenham Hotspur's youth setup, Olsen signed with Valencia CF. He made his senior debuts with the reserves in the 2008–09 season, in Segunda División B. Olsen also appeared three times with the main team, starting in a 1–1 away draw against Al Ain FC and scoring twice vs Standard Liege.

After being sparingly used in his third season, Olsen left the Valencians and signed with Odd Grenland BK. On 2 September he made his debut, coming on as a late substitute in a 1–0 away win over FK Haugesund.

On 29 October 2013, Olsen returned to Spain, signing with CD Castellón until 23 December, to get back to fitness after a crucial ligament rupture in Norway. In March the following year he moved teams and countries again, signing a one-year deal with Fredrikstad FK. Ahead of the 2016 season he returned home to Gjøvik and FK Gjøvik-Lyn.

Career statistics

References

External links
 

1989 births
Living people
Sportspeople from Gjøvik
Association football forwards
Association football wingers
Norwegian footballers
Segunda División B players
Tercera División players
Norwegian First Division players
Valencia CF Mestalla footballers
Odds BK players
CD Castellón footballers
Fredrikstad FK players
Norwegian expatriate footballers
Norwegian expatriate sportspeople in England
Norwegian expatriate sportspeople in Spain
Expatriate footballers in England
Expatriate footballers in Spain